Reformed Catholics is an Independent Catholic denomination founded in New York City, United States, in 1879, by some priests who left the Catholic Church. It was not in communion with the pope in Rome.

Dissident formerly Catholic priests formed a few congregations chiefly in New York, and began evangelistic work on a Protestant basis of belief. The leader of the movement was James A. O'Connor, the editor of The Converted Catholic, New York City, which protested against features of the Roman system of doctrine, government, discipline, and practise, and teaches Protestant doctrine as understood by the Evangelical churches. Opposition to the sacramental system of the Catholic Church was a pronounced feature of this body. They believed that the salvation of the believer was not dependent on his or her relation to the church, but came directly from Christ. Hence, there was no need of intermediaries or other mediators. All can come directly to God by faith in Christ, the only high priest. The Holy Spirit is the only teaching power in the church. At its height, the denomination had six churches, eight ministers, and about 2,000 or 3,000 communicants.

A new Reformed Catholic Church was established in the 1990s. It is currently led by Bishop Christopher Carpenter and has communities across the US.

Notes

References
 
 

Protestant denominations established in the 19th century
Religious organizations established in 1879
Independent Catholic denominations